Arno Arthur Wachmann (8 March 1902 – 24 July 1990) was a German astronomer and discoverer of comets and minor planets, who worked for many years at the Bergedorf Observatory in Hamburg.

With Arnold Schwassmann he co-discovered the periodic comets 29P/Schwassmann–Wachmann, 31P/Schwassmann–Wachmann and 73P/Schwassmann–Wachmann. The Minor Planet Center credits him with the discovery of 3 asteroids during 1938–1939.

The inner main-belt asteroid 1704 Wachmann was named in his honor.

Reference Notes 
 

1902 births
1990 deaths
Discoverers of asteroids
Discoverers of comets

20th-century German astronomers